Fay is an unincorporated rural village  located on State Highway 33 in the extreme southeastern corner of Dewey County, Oklahoma, United States. There is a grainery at Fay, a small convenience grocery, and a community hall with auditorium. Also located at Fay is the headquarters of Indian Records Inc..

History
Platted along the St. Louis-San Francisco Railway line, the Fay Post Office opened April 19, 1894. Fay was named after Fay Fisco, the son of the first postmaster.

Demographics

References

Sources
 Shirk, George H. Oklahoma Place Names. Norman: University of Oklahoma Press, 1987. .

Unincorporated communities in Dewey County, Oklahoma
Unincorporated communities in Oklahoma